Aquarius nebularis is a species of water strider in the family Gerridae. It is found in the eastern United States from New York south to central Florida and west to Louisiana, Arkansas, and Iowa.

Adults reach lengths of 14–16 mm. Aquarius nebularis is part of the A. elongatus species group, being most closely related to A. conformis, a species also found in eastern North America.

References

Insects described in 1925
Gerrini